The following is a list of people from Etobicoke, Ontario.

Sportspeople
 David Bolland, ice hockey player (London Knights, member of the National Canadian Junior Hockey Team)
 Connor Brown, ice hockey player
 David Clarkson, ice hockey player
 Paul Clatney, former Canadian football linebacker/defensive back
 Carlo Colaiacovo, professional hockey player
 Ken Dryden, politician and former NHL goaltender; attended Etobicoke Collegiate Institute
 Manny Fernandez, former ice hockey player
 Dave Huntley, former professional lacrosse player
 Emilie Livingston, rhythmic gymnast
 Steve Ludzik, ice hockey player, coach, analyst
 Mark Napier, ice hockey player
 Colin Patterson, professional hockey player
 Dave Reid (ice hockey, born 1964), retired Canadian ice hockey left winger
 Brendan Shanahan, former ice hockey player and current President and Alternate Governor for the Toronto Maple Leafs
 Brendan Smith, professional hockey player
 Jordan Subban, professional hockey player
 Malcolm Subban, professional hockey player 
 P. K. Subban, professional hockey player
 Paul Stalteri, soccer player
 Stephen Valiquette, former ice hockey player (New York Rangers goalie)
 Joey Votto, baseball player (Cincinnati Reds first baseman)
 Peter Zezel, former ice hockey and soccer player

Media
 Jerry Agar, host of Jerry Agar Show NEWSTALK1010; resident
 Jason Agnew, television producer, host, radio personality and writer
 King Bach, Actor, Comedian, and Director
 Bruce McDonald, film and television director
 Nicole Stamp, host of Reach For The Top; attended Richview Collegiate Institute

Musicians
 Dave Bidini, musician, the Rheostatics, author On a Cold Road, Tropic of Hockey
 Basia Bulat, musician
 Dave Clark, musician, the Rheostatics and The Dinner Is Ruined
 Tom Cochrane, musician
 Cold Specks, musician, now based in London
 Ghetto Concept, hip-hop artists, pioneers in Toronto's hip-hop scene (Rexdale)
 Jelleestone, hip hop musician
 Jeff Healey, rock musician
 K'naan, hip hop musician
 NAV, hip hop recording artist and record producer
 Rheostatics, rock band
 Steve Shelski, musician, composer
 Jane Siberry, singer, songwriter, poet
 Snow, hip-hop artist, "Informer"
 Martin Tielli, musician, the Rheostatics
 Tim Vesely, musician, the Rheostatics
 Spek Won, hip hop musician

Actors
 King Bach, Actor, Comedian, and Director
 Daniel DeSanto, actor and voice actor
 Robin Duke, actress; attended Burnhamthorpe Collegiate Institute
 Dave Foley, actor
 Mike Lobel, actor; attended Etobicoke School of the Arts
 Catherine O'Hara, actress; attended Burnhamthorpe Collegiate Institute
 Anastasia Phillips, actress
 Dan Redican, actor/writer
 Michael Seater, actor
 Kiefer Sutherland, actor; attended several local schools including John G. Althouse Middle School, Martingrove Collegiate Institute and Silverthorn Collegiate Institute
 Katheryn Winnick, actress

Politicians
 Tim Bardsley, ex-politician, now lawyer
 Nathan Cullen, NDP Member of Parliament
 Doug Ford Sr., was a Canadian businessman and politician
 Doug Ford, Jr., premier of Ontario
 Rob Ford, late and former Mayor of Toronto
 John Hallett, politician
 Stephen Harper, former Prime Minister of Canada; attended Richview Collegiate Institute
 Allan Rock, former Minister of Health & Canadian Ambassador to the United Nations; attended Richview Collegiate Institute
 J.S. Woodsworth, social activist and founding leader of the Co-operative Commonwealth Federation, the precursor to the New Democratic Party

Etobicoke